Wereholme, also known as the Harold H. Weekes Estate, and the Scully Estate, is a historic estate located at Islip in Suffolk County, New York.  The mansion was built in 1917 in the French Provincial style and designed by architect Grosvenor Atterbury (1869–1956). It is a "L" shaped structure built of concrete block.  It is three stories high with a hipped roof and the servants' wing is two stories with a clipped cross-gable roof. Also on the property are two garages, greenhouse, barrel vaulted dovecote, and entrance pillars from South Bay Avenue.

History
The property was originally part of Windholme which was eventually split between the children of the owners.  Louise Peters received  and had Wereholme built.  She passed the house to her daughter, Hathaway.  "Happy" eventually donated it to the Audubon Society who sold it to Suffolk County in 2004.

It was added to the National Register of Historic Places in 2007.

Suffolk County Nature Center
The Suffolk County Nature Center opened on the property on Earth Day, 2010. The Center is operated by the Seatuck Environmental Center through a long-term custodial agreement with the Suffolk County Department of Parks, Recreation and Conservation.

Wereholme has been restored, and features natural history exhibits, a nature library and space for programs.

The 70-acre property is adjacent to the Seatuck National Wildlife Refuge and the Islip Town Beach. Trails and boardwalks allow visitors to view different ecosystems, including salt marsh, freshwater wetlands and mature upland forest.

References

External links

Scully Estate (Suffolk County Department of Parks)
Suffolk County Nature Center - Seatuck Environmental Center

Houses on the National Register of Historic Places in New York (state)
Houses in Suffolk County, New York
Nature centers in New York (state)
Tourist attractions in Suffolk County, New York
National Register of Historic Places in Suffolk County, New York